In Marxist theory, especially that of Louis Althusser, interpellation is a culture's or ideology's creating of identity for "individuals".

Althusser wrote that, with interpellation, "individuals are always-already subjects." The "individual" is even "interpellated as a (free) subject ... that he shall submit freely to the commandments of the Subject, i.e. in order that he shall (freely) accept his subjection". According to Althusser, every society is made up of ideological state apparatuses (ISAs) and repressive state apparatuses (RSAs) which are instrumental to constant reproduction of the relations to the production of that given society. While RSAs are institutions that directly repress dissent and opposition (police/military) ISAs reproduce capitalism through non-repressive ideological means (family, church, schools, the media and politics). Consequently, 'interpellation' describes the process by which ideology, embodied in major social and political institutions (ISAs and RSAs), constitutes the very nature of individual subjects' identities through the process of "hailing" them in social interactions.

Althusser's thought has made significant contributions to other French philosophers, notably Derrida, Kristeva, Barthes, Foucault, Deleuze, and Badiou.

Overview 
In "Ideology and Ideological State Apparatuses (Notes Towards an Investigation)", Althusser introduces the concepts of ideological state apparatuses (ISA), repressive state apparatuses (RSAs), ideology, and interpellation. In his writing, Althusser argues that "there is no ideology except by the subject and for the subject". This notion of subjectivity becomes central to his writings.

To illustrate this concept, Althusser gives the example of a friend who knocks on a door. The person inside asks "Who is there?" and only opens the door once the "It's me" from the outside sounds familiar. By doing so, the person inside partakes in "a material ritual practice of ideological recognition in everyday life". In other words, Althusser's central thesis is that "you and I are always already subjects" and are constantly engaging in everyday rituals, like greeting someone or shaking hands, which makes us subjected to ideology.

Althusser goes further to argue that "all ideology hails or interpellates concrete individuals as concrete subjects" and emphasizes that "ideology 'acts' or 'functions' in such a way that it ... 'transforms' the individual into subjects". This is made possible through Althusser's notion of interpellation or hailing which is a non-specific and unconscious process. For example, when a police officer shouts (or hails) "Hey, you there!" and an individual turns around and so-to-speak 'answers' the call, he becomes a subject. Althusser argues that this is because the individual has realized that the hailing was addressed at him which makes him subjective to the ideology of democracy and law.

Consequently, individual subjects are presented principally as produced by social forces, rather than acting as powerful independent agents with self-produced identities.

Althusser's argument here strongly draws from Jacques Lacan's concept of the mirror stage. However, unlike Lacan who distinguishes between the "I" (i.e., the conscious ego which is created by the mirror stage) and the "subject" (that is, the symbolic subject of the unconscious), Althusser collapses both concepts into one.

Other applications 
German philosophers Theodor Adorno and Max Horkheimer employ a method of analysis similar to Althusser's notion of interpellation in their text Dialectic of Enlightenment, although they do so 26 years before "Ideology and Ideological State Apparatuses" was released. Rather than situating their analysis heavily on the State, Adorno and Horkheimer argue that the mass media—the "culture industry"—also plays a role in the construction of passive subjects. So unlike the police officer in Althusser's example who reinforces the ideology of democracy and law, the mass media now plays a powerful complementary role in the creation of a passive consumer.  However, whereas Althusser sought to make subjectivity a mere epiphenomenon of institutional interpellation, Adorno and Horkheimer insisted on a concept of subjectivity that was not limited to an institutional definition. They sought to expose tendencies favoring "total administration" over the individual and their subjective potential, while Althusser's analysis seemed only to confirm those tendencies.

Feminist scholar and queer theorist Judith Butler has critically applied a framework based on interpellation to highlight the social construction of gender identities. She argues that by hailing "It's a boy/girl," the newborn baby is ultimately positioned as subject.

Media theorist David Gauntlett argues that "interpellation occurs when a person connects with a media text: when we enjoy a magazine or TV show, for example, this uncritical consumption means that the text has interpellated us into a certain set of assumptions, and caused us to tacitly accept a particular approach to the world."

References 

 Marxist terminology
 Psychoanalytic terminology
 Jacques Lacan
Post-structuralism
Structuralism
 French legal terminology
Critical theory

fr:Contrôle d'identité en France
fr:Droit d'interpellation